The 2011 Mecklenburg-Vorpommern state election was held on 4 September 2011 to elect the members of the 6th Landtag of Mecklenburg-Vorpommern. The incumbent grand coalition of the Social Democratic Party (SPD) and Christian Democratic Union (CDU) led by Minister-President Erwin Sellering retained its majority and continued in government.

Issues and campaign

Christian Democratic Union
The Christian Democrats 30-page election platform was called "clear and decisive". The platform includes education policy, finances and population change.

The Christian Democrats campaigned with the slogan "C wie Zukunft" ("C for Future"). This was intended to link the first letter of both the party's and the frontrunner Lorenz Caffier's name with the positive term "future". However, recipients understood that the CDU suggested to write the word "Zukunft" with a "C". This earned the conservatives scorn and derision.

Social Democratic Party
Social Democrats focused on issues of economy, labor, energy change, social justice, family and education.

In the government SPD plans same time to cancel the tax release of the hotels and restaurants with a value of 1.7 billion euros, collect 2 billion euros by the higher peak tax and further 1.7 billion euros by increase of the nuclear plant fuel tax.

The Left
The Left platform includes employment and economic rights, social justice, environmental protection and more democratic participation.

Parties
The table below lists parties represented in the 5th Landtag of Mecklenburg-Vorpommern.

Opinion polling

Election result
The Social Democratic Party (SPD) were the clear winners of election with 35.7 percent of the votes. It increased 5.5 percentage points over the last election in 2006. The Christian Democratic Union (CDU) support fell by 5.7 percent, ending up with 23.1 percent. The Free Democratic Party (FDP) got only 2.7 percent of the vote, a massive drop of 6.9 percent compared to the last election, when it received 9.6 percent. The FDP failed to qualify for the Landtag for the fifth time in  the last six state elections. The FDP Chairman Philipp Rösler claimed responsibility for failing to qualify for the Landtag. The Green Party reached the 5% minimum and qualified for the first time in Landtag of Mecklenburg-Vorpommern. The Greens have now  seats in all of Germany's 16 state parliaments.

The far right National Democratic Party (NPD) won in excess of 30% of the votes in 2 of the districts in this election and 26% to 29% in some communities near Anklam and Torgelow. In Koblentz, the NPD finished 15% higher than the CDU and the SPD. Leaders of some of the parties have come out and stated their opposition and shock at the success of the NPD. Rösler also stated that "it is shocking that the radical right-wing NPD has received twice as many votes as the FDP". SPD leader Erwin Sellering wasn't happy about the NPD re-entering the Landtag and stated "It’s a shame that they’ve made it in again and very regrettable".

|-
|colspan=8 align=center| 
|-
! colspan="2" | Party
! Votes
! %
! +/-
! Seats 
! +/-
! Seats %
|-
| bgcolor=| 
| align=left | Social Democratic Party (SPD)
| align=right| 242,251
| align=right| 35.6
| align=right|  5.4
| align=right| 27
| align=right|  4
| align=right| 38.0
|-
| bgcolor=| 
| align=left | Christian Democratic Union (CDU)
| align=right| 156,969
| align=right| 23.0
| align=right|  5.8
| align=right| 18
| align=right|  4
| align=right| 25.4
|-
| bgcolor=| 
| align=left | The Left (DIE LINKE)
| align=right| 125,528
| align=right| 18.4
| align=right|  1.1
| align=right| 14
| align=right|  1
| align=right| 19.7
|-
| bgcolor=| 
| align=left | Alliance 90/The Greens (GRÜNE)
| align=right| 59,004
| align=right| 8.7
| align=right|  5.3
| align=right| 7
| align=right|  7
| align=right| 9.9
|-
| bgcolor=| 
| align=left | National Democratic Party (NPD)
| align=right| 40,642
| align=right| 6.0
| align=right|  1.3
| align=right| 5
| align=right|  1
| align=right| 7.0
|-
! colspan=8|
|-
| bgcolor=| 
| align=left | Free Democratic Party (FDP)
| align=right| 18,943
| align=right| 2.8
| align=right|  6.8
| align=right| 0
| align=right|  7
| align=right| 0
|-
| bgcolor=| 
| align=left | Pirate Party Germany (PIRATEN)
| align=right| 12,727
| align=right| 1.9
| align=right|  1.9
| align=right| 0
| align=right|  0
| align=right| 0
|-
| bgcolor=| 
| align=left | Family Party (FAMILIE)
| align=right| 10,538
| align=right| 1.5
| align=right|  0.3
| align=right| 0
| align=right|  0
| align=right| 0
|-
| bgcolor=|
| align=left | Other parties
| align=right| 14,773
| align=right| 2.2
| align=right|  0.6
| align=right| 0
| align=right|  0
| align=right| 0
|-
! align=right colspan=2| Total
! align=right| 681,375
! align=right| 100.0
! align=right| 
! align=right| 71
! align=right|  0
! align=right| 
|-
! align=right colspan=2| Voter turnout
! align=right| 
! align=right| 51.5
! align=right|  7.7
! align=right| 
! align=right| 
! align=right| 
|}

Notes

References

Mecklenburg-Vorpommern
2011
2010s in Mecklenburg-Western Pomerania